The men's 1500 metres event at the 2001 Summer Universiade was held at the Workers Stadium in Beijing, China on 27–29 August.

Medalists

Results

Heats

Final

References

Athletics at the 2001 Summer Universiade
2001